Public Disturbance may mean:

Civil disorder, a broad term used for various forms of unrest
Public Disturbance (band), a hardcore punk band from South Wales, formed in 1995